Ayyan Ali is a Pakistani model and singer. She started modeling in 2010 and won the title of Best Female Emerging Model. She was nominated four times for the Lux Style Awards. In 2013, she clarified that she only wanted to be publicly referred to as "Ayyan" and not "Ayyan Ali".

Career 
Ayyan started her career as a model at the age of sixteen. She started modeling in 2010 and won the title of Best Female Emerging Model. She was nominated four times for the Lux Style Awards. She has worked with fashion designers including Hassan Sheheryar Yasin, Karma, Chinyere (Bareeze) and Gul Ahmed.

In 2010, Ayyan was awarded the title of Calvin Klein ‘Beauty of the Year 2010’. Later she became their brand ambassador. That same year she was nominated for Best Female Emerging Model for the Lux Style Awards, and in 2011 for Best Female Model.

She won Best Female Model for 2012 at the Pakistan Media Awards.  Her music video and single called You and I was released on the occasion of Eid in July 2014 and was panned by the critics.

Charges and Arrest 
On 14 March 2015, the Pakistan Airport Security Forces arrested Ayyan and charged her with money laundering. She was boarding a flight to UAE from Benazir International Airport in Islamabad. Ayyan was off to Dubai through a private airline when Airport Security Force (ASF) checked her luggage on the counter and discovered US$506,800.  She was presented before a customs judge who sent her on a fourteen-day judicial remand. She was then taken to a medical facility for examination. The $500,000 in her suitcase exceeded the legal limit of cash that can be carried out of Pakistan, which is $10,000. During interrogation she allegedly named several Pakistani politicians and models   involved in money laundering. On 16 July 2015, Ayyan was released from jail on bail.

Murder of Customs Inspector who caught her
The widow of the customs inspector who was to be the key prosecution witness in the money laundering case of Ayyan Ali, stated that her husband had been killed by Asif Ali Zardari to protect Ayyan.

Discography 
Singles
 Earthquake
 Making Dollars feat. Timo
 You and I feat. F.Charm

Awards and nominations 
Following are the awards and nominations for Ayyan.

See also 
 List of Pakistani models

References

External links 
 Ayyan in SoundCloud

Living people
Pakistani female models
People from Dubai
Actresses from Karachi
Pakistani television actresses
Hum Award winners
21st-century Pakistani actresses
Pakistani women singers
Pakistani prisoners and detainees
Pakistani money launderers
1993 births